The 2015–16 Ole Miss Rebels men's basketball team represented the University of Mississippi in the 2015–16 NCAA Division I men's basketball season. Andy Kennedy was in his 10th year as head coach of Ole Miss. The Rebels, members of the Southeastern Conference, began the season playing home games at Tad Smith Coliseum, but moved to a new arena, The Pavilion at Ole Miss, on January 7, 2016. They finished the season 20–12, 10–8 in SEC play to finish in a tie for sixth place. They lost to Alabama in the second round of the SEC tournament. Despite having 20 wins, they did not participate in a postseason tournament.

Previous season
The Rebels finished the 2014–15 season with an overall record of 21–13 and 11–7 in SEC play to finish in a four-way tie for third place in the SEC standings. They lost in the second round of the SEC tournament to South Carolina. Ole Miss participated in the NCAA tournament as an #11 seed, defeating fellow #11 seed BYU in the first round before falling to #6 seeded Xavier in the second round, ending the Rebels' season.

Departures

Incoming transfers

Recruits

Roster

Schedule and results

|-
!colspan=9 style="background:#; color:white;"| Exhibition

|-
!colspan=9 style="background:#; color:white;"| Regular season

|-
!colspan=9 style="background:#; color:white;"| SEC tournament

See also
2015–16 Ole Miss Rebels women's basketball team
2015–16 NCAA Division I men's basketball season

References

Ole Miss
Ole Miss Rebels men's basketball seasons
Ole Miss Rebels basketball
Ole Miss Rebels